Wilhelmus Maria "Wim" Jonk (born 12 October 1966) is a Dutch professional football manager and former player, who is the current head coach of Eredivisie club FC Volendam.

In his career as a midfielder, he won a variety of national honours with Ajax and PSV. Abroad, he won the UEFA Cup with Inter Milan in 1994 and played in the Premier League with Sheffield Wednesday.

A Dutch international with 49 caps between 1992 and 1999, he represented the team at UEFA Euro 1992 and the FIFA World Cups of 1994 and 1998, helping them come fourth at the latter.

Club career 
Born in Volendam, Jonk started his career in amateur club RKAV Volendam, before signing for FC Volendam in 1986. A prolific scorer from midfield, he helped his club achieve  promotion to the Eredivisie in 1987. Ajax signed him in 1988.

At Ajax, he merged into the squad easily, scoring six goals in his debut season. He helped Ajax to the 1992 UEFA Cup Final in which he scored to help them overcome Torino.

He signed for Inter Milan in 1993 on a three-year deal. He was joined by compatriot Dennis Bergkamp who also joined from Ajax. He cost £3.3 million, and Bergkamp £7.1 million. He managed 54 appearances in two seasons and scored eight goals. He scored in a UEFA Cup Final again, this time as Inter won the 1994 final. 

When Bergkamp left Inter for Arsenal at the end of the 1994–95 season, Jonk felt that his opportunities were limited as he neared the age of 30, and he went back to the Netherlands to sign with PSV. 

For the 1998–99 season, Jonk went to join Sheffield Wednesday for a fee of £2.5 million, where he was a regular starter for the relegation-threatened side. He joined the team having been inspired by tales of the Premier League from his compatriots Jaap Stam and Arthur Numan. He was frequently injured, which caused the Wednesday fans to voice dissent about a clause in his contract which stipulated that he would automatically receive £7,500 per game which he would miss through injury. He barely played in the 2000–01 season, the last of his contract, due to a groin injury, but he said in May 2001 that he wanted to return to playing.

International career
Jonk made his debut for the Dutch national team in a 3–2 win in a friendly against Austria on 27 May 1992. 

At the 1994 FIFA World Cup in the United States, Jonk represented Dick Advocaat's Dutch team. He scored the equaliser in a 2–1 group win over Saudi Arabia, and another long-range goal in a win against the Republic of Ireland in the last 16.

While at PSV, Jonk was selected by Guus Hiddink for the 1998 FIFA World Cup in France, after being overlooked for UEFA Euro 1996. He played five out of seven games as the team came fourth.

With the appointment of Frank Rijkaard as the new manager after the 1998 World Cup, Jonk played only once more for the Netherlands in a friendly against Denmark on 18 August 1999. He finished his international career on 49 caps and 11 goals.

Managerial career

Head of Academy 
After his career as a player, Jonk featured as a football pundit on NOS Studio Sport, before returning to his childhood club FC Volendam as the board member for technical affairs. In this role, Jonk also worked as an individual trainer and assistant to the first and second team of FC Volendam.

Between 2008 until November 2015, Jonk worked for Ajax. After ongoing disagreement between Jonk and Cruyff with the board of directors, about the interpretation and lack of implementation of the Plan Cruyff at the first team and in the overall club policy, Jonk left the club in December 2015, together with Cruyff and a large group of key academy personnel.

Cruyff Football 
Jonk and Jordi Cruyff co-manage and lead the Amsterdam-based international football institute Cruyff Football, based on the Plan Cruyff and the legacy of Johan Cruyff.

Volendam 
On 13 April 2019, Jonk was announced as the new manager of Eerste Divisie club FC Volendam. Three years later, he led the team to the top flight for the first time in 13 years.

Personal life
Jonk and his wife Gina have two children as of 2001. When he played for Sheffield Wednesday, they lived in Dore, South Yorkshire. Jonk is Catholic; while many of his Dutch teammates were raised in the church, he was the only one of his contemporaries to make the sign of the cross while playing.

Managerial statistics

Honours
Ajax
 Eredivisie: 1989–90
 KNVB Cup: 1992–93
 UEFA Cup: 1991–92

Inter Milan
 UEFA Cup: 1993–94

PSV
 Eredivisie: 1996–97
 KNVB Cup: 1995–96
 Johan Cruijff Shield: 1996, 1997, 1998

References

External links

1966 births
Living people
Dutch expatriate footballers
Association football midfielders
Dutch footballers
Netherlands international footballers
AFC Ajax players
Inter Milan players
PSV Eindhoven players
FC Volendam players
Sheffield Wednesday F.C. players
Eredivisie players
Premier League players
Serie A players
UEFA Euro 1992 players
1994 FIFA World Cup players
1998 FIFA World Cup players
Expatriate footballers in Italy
Expatriate footballers in England
Dutch expatriate sportspeople in Italy
Dutch expatriate sportspeople in England
People from Volendam
AFC Ajax non-playing staff
UEFA Cup winning players
Dutch football managers
Eerste Divisie managers
FC Volendam managers
Dutch Roman Catholics
Footballers from North Holland